The siege of Danzig was a six-month siege in 1577 of the city of Danzig, the Polish–Lithuanian Commonwealth (today Gdańsk) by Stephen Báthory, the head of state of the Commonwealth. The siege ended in a negotiated agreement. It formed part of the Danzig rebellion.

The conflict began when the city of Danzig, along with the Polish episcopate and a portion of the Polish szlachta, did not recognize the royal election of Bathory to the Commonwealth throne and instead supported the candidature of Emperor Maximilian. This led to a short conflict, of which the siege of Danzig was the last part.

After a siege of six months, the Danzig army of 5,000 mercenaries, among them a Scottish regiment, was utterly defeated in a field battle on 16 December 1577. However, since Báthory's armies – the combined Commonwealth, Hungarian, and Wallachian forces – were unable to take the city itself, a compromise was reached: Báthory confirmed the city's special status and its Danzig law privileges granted by the earlier Polish kings in return for 200,000 złotys reparations and recognition of him as sovereign.

See also 
 History of Gdańsk (Danzig)

References 

Danzig
1577 in Europe
Danzig
History of Gdańsk
Danzig
1577 in the Polish–Lithuanian Commonwealth
Events in Gdańsk